Andrey Sergeyevich Zeits (born 14 December 1986) is a Kazakh road bicycle racer, who currently rides for UCI WorldTeam . In 2009, Zeits rode the Giro d'Italia, the first grand tour of his career, which he finished in 31st place.

After twelve years with the  team, Zeits joined  on a two-year contract from the 2020 season. He rejoined the renamed  for the 2022 season.

Major results

2006
 1st Stage 4 Giro della Valle d'Aosta
2007
 4th Giro del Belvedere
 6th Gran Premio Palio del Recioto
 7th Overall Grand Prix Guillaume Tell
 9th Overall Giro delle Regioni
 10th Road race, UCI Under-23 Road World Championships
2008
 2nd Time trial, National Road Championships
2009
 3rd Time trial, National Road Championships
2011
 2nd Overall Tour of Turkey
2012
 5th Time trial, National Road Championships
 8th Overall Tour de Langkawi
2013
 1st Stage 1 (TTT) Vuelta a España
2014
 1st  Sprints classification, Vuelta a Andalucía
 3rd Overall Tour of Hainan
1st  Asian rider classification
2015
 2nd Overall Tour of Hainan
1st Stage 8
 10th Tour of Almaty
2016
 8th Road race, Olympic Games
 8th Overall Tour de Pologne
2017
 1st Team time trial, Asian Road Championships
 9th Overall Tour of Turkey
2018
 National Road Championships
3rd Time trial
5th Road race
2019
 4th Overall CRO Race
2021
 10th Overall Settimana Ciclistica Italiana
2022
 6th Road race, Asian Road Championships
 8th Mont Ventoux Dénivelé Challenge
 9th Overall Giro di Sicilia
 9th Overall Route d'Occitanie
 10th Overall Tour de Langkawi

Grand Tour general classification results timeline

References

External links

 

Kazakhstani male cyclists
1986 births
Living people
Cyclists at the 2016 Summer Olympics
Olympic cyclists of Kazakhstan
People from Pavlodar
Kazakhstani people of Russian descent
21st-century Kazakhstani people